KSWW (102.1 FM) is a radio station broadcasting an adult contemporary music format. Licensed to Ocean Shores, Washington, United States, it serves Grays Harbor County. The station is currently owned by Jodesha Broadcasting. It is known as "Sunny 102.1". The station first signed on in 1998. Except for their morning show with Rhys Davis, 6am-10am weekdays, all programming is off Westwood One's AC feed.

Translators
KSWW also broadcasts on the following translators:

K234AU rebroadcasts KSWW-HD3. K263BE rebroadcasts KSWW-HD2. K226AN, K281DE and K291BY rebroadcast KSWW-HD4.

References

External links
Jodesha Broadcasting stations

SWW
Radio stations established in 1998